In the 2000–2001 Heineken Cup pool stage matches, teams received
 2 points for a win
 1 points for a draw

Pool 1

Edinburgh finished above Leinster despite having a lower points difference, as the first tie-breaker was the results in the two matches between the teams.

Pool 2

Pool 3

Cardiff won the group despite having a lower points difference than Saracens, as the first tie-breaker was the results in the two matches between the teams.

Pool 4

Pool 5

Pool 6

Seeding

See also
 2000–01 Heineken Cup

References

Pool Stage
Heineken Cup pool stages